Miguel Núñez Borreguero (born 4 June 1987) is a Spanish footballer who plays for CD Eldense. Mainly a defensive midfielder, he can also play as a central defender or a left-back.

Club career
Núñez was born in Siruela, Province of Badajoz. He spent the better part of his first nine seasons as a senior with Albacete Balompié, also representing their reserves and CF Villanovense (on loan) in the Tercera División.

Núñez made his Segunda División debut with the first team on 30 January 2010, coming on as a 70th-minute substitute in a 2–2 home draw against Rayo Vallecano and scoring the game's last goal. He was relegated twice with the club from that tier, making 212 competitive appearances during his spell.

After leaving the Estadio Carlos Belmonte, Núñez continued to play in the third division, with SD Ponferradina, RCD Mallorca, UD Ibiza, CF Badalona, CD Badajoz and CD Eldense.

References

External links

1987 births
Living people
Sportspeople from the Province of Badajoz
Spanish footballers
Footballers from Extremadura
Association football defenders
Association football midfielders
Association football utility players
Segunda División players
Segunda División B players
Tercera División players
Primera Federación players
CF Villanovense players
Atlético Albacete players
Albacete Balompié players
SD Ponferradina players
RCD Mallorca players
UD Ibiza players
CF Badalona players
CD Badajoz players
CD Eldense footballers